O.C.B. is an album released by Polish rapper O.S.T.R. on February 27, 2009.

Track listing

Singles
 "Po drodze do nieba" (2009)

2009 albums
O.S.T.R. albums
Polish-language albums